"Can't Get Over" is a song by Swedish singer September from her third studio album Dancing Shoes (2007). Written by Anoo Bhagavan, Jonas von der Burg and Niklas von der Burg, it was released on 20 June 2007 in Sweden as the lead single from the album. The song was also released as a single from September's various compilations that were released internationally, with a new remix of the song was released in the UK on 9 March 2009 as the second single from Cry for You - The Album (2009).  Commercially, "Can't Get Over" was a commercial success, peaking at five in Sweden and fourteen in the United Kingdom.

Music video

Promotional video
Two official music videos were released for the single. The first video was a promotional video which did not release officially through airplay and other charts. The video features September in a trouble relationship, the video also features promotional small snippets of her for the photoshoot of the covers.

New release video
The second video was released by Happy Music on their official YouTube page. The video was a second video and the track was edited as the UK Radio edit. The video featured September in a futuristic styled theme where she's driving a flying car, then she is in a white room, singing and dancing to the single. Then it features her walking to a room where it shows her boyfriend, as he is trapped in a laser-fence. The video ends where she and her boyfriend drive away, and the police force follow them after it cuts black. That version was released worldwide as the official video for the single.

Chart performance

"Can't Get Over" received some success throughout the globe. The song debuted at number fourteen on the UK Singles Chart, and fell to ninety-four after six weeks. The song debuted at number fourteen in the Swedish Singles Chart on 28 June 2007. The song peaked at number five after five weeks in the charts. The song peaked at number twelve on the US Billboard Hot Dance Airplay.

The song received more limited success throughout Oceania. The song had debuted and peaked at number forty-one on the Australian Singles Chart. The song however did not chart in New Zealand's RIANZ charts, it did chart on New Zealand Official Airplay. The song peaked at number thirty-three on the charts.

The single was successful elsewhere. It peaked at number thirty-five in the Netherlands, number ten in Finland and number forty-one in Belgium.

Track listing
"Can't Get Over" (Released in Sweden, United States, Holland)
"Can't Get Over" (Radio) (3:02)
"Can't Get Over" (Extended) (4:35)
"Can't Get Over" (Short Disco 2007) (3:54)
"Can't Get Over" (Long Disco 2007) (6:54)

"Can't Get Over" (United States Re-release [UK Edit Remixes])
"Can't Get Over" (UK Radio Edit) (3:12)
"Can't Get Over" (Dave Ramone Edit) (3:00)
"Can't Get Over" (Wideboys Edit) (3:12)
"Can't Get Over" (Jens Kindervater Edit) (3:26)
"Can't Get Over" (Figoboy Remix) (5:34)
"Can't Get Over" (Dave Ramone Remix) (6:16)
"Can't Get Over" (Wideboys Remix) (6:30)
"Can't Get Over" (Jens Kindervater Remix) (4:48)
"Can't Get Over" (Buzz Junkies Remix) (5:58)
"Can't Get Over" (Wideboys Dub) (6:30)
"Can't Get Over" (Buzz Junkies Dub) (5:58)
"Can't Get Over" (Instrumental Edit) (3:17)

"Can't Get Over" (UK CD single)
Pink version:
 "Can’t Get Over" (UK Radio Edit)
 "Can’t Get Over" (Wideboys Edit)
Blue version:
 "Can’t Get Over" (UK Radio Edit)
 "Can’t Get Over" (Figoboy Remix)
 "Can’t Get Over" (Dave Ramone Edit)
 "Can’t Get Over" (Original Edit)
 "Cry For You" (Warren Clarke Mix)
 Bonus material (music video, photos, etc.)

"Can't Get Over" (Australian CD single)
 "Can't Get Over" (UK Radio Edit)
 "Can't Get Over" (Wideboys Edit)
 "Can't Get Over" (Dave Ramone Edit)
 "Can't Get Over" (Original Edit)
 "Can't Get Over" (Buzz Junkies Club Mix)
 "Can't Get Over" (Jens Kindervater Mix)
 "Can't Get Over" (Figoboy Mix)

"Can't Get Over" (Australian digital download)
"Can't Get Over" (Original) (3:00)
"Can't Get Over" (Wideboys Edit) (3:08)
"Can't Get Over" (Dave Ramone Edit) (2:58)
"Can't Get Over" (Original Mix) (4:33)
"Can't Get Over" (Buzz Junkies Club Mix) (5:54)
"Can't Get Over" (Jens Kindervater Remix) (4:46)
"Can't Get Over" (Figoboy Remix) (5:34)
"Can't Get Over" (Dave Ramone Remix) (6:14)
"Can't Get Over" (Buzz Junkies Dub Mix) (5:52)
"Can't Get Over" (Wideboys Dub) (6:28)
"Can't Get Over" (Wideboys Remix) (6:28)
"Can't Get Over" (UK Radio Edit) (3:10)
"Can't Get Over" (Instrumental) (3:17)

"Can't Get Over" (Holland Re-release)
 "Can't Get Over" (UK Radio Edit)
 "Can’t Get Over" (Original Edit)

"Can't Get Over" (French digital download)
 "Can't Get Over" (UK Radio Edit)
 "Can't Get Over" (Original Edit)
 "Can't Get Over" (Dave Ramone Edit)
 "Can't Get Over" (Wideboys Edit)
 "Can't Get Over" (Dave Ramone Remix)
 "Can't Get Over" (Figoboy Remix)
 "Can't Get Over" (Kindervater Remix)
 "Can't Get Over" (Wideboys Dub)
 "Can't Get Over" (Wideboys Remix)

Release history

Charts

Personnel
The following people contributed to "Can't Get Over":
September – lead vocals, backing vocals
Anoo Bhagavan – backing vocals
Jonas von der Burg – production, mixing, keyboards, programming
Joe Yannece – engineering
Björn Axelsson, Niklas von der Burg – keyboards
Björn Engelmann Cutting Room Studios – mastering

Notes

2007 singles
2009 singles
Petra Marklund songs
Dance-pop songs
Songs written by Jonas von der Burg
Songs written by Niklas von der Burg
Songs written by Anoo Bhagavan
2007 songs